Robert Pirie may refer to:

Robert S. Pirie (1934–2015), American bibliophile and lawyer
Robert B. Pirie (1905–1990), Vice Admiral in the United States Navy 
Robert B. Pirie Jr. (born 1933), Assistant Secretary of the United States Navy
Bob Pirie (1916–1984), Canadian freestyle swimmer

See also
Pirie (disambiguation)